Castres-en-Albigenses was a dependence of the Viscount of Albi. The Viscounts of Albi granted Castres a city charter establishing a commune with the city, headed by consuls. During the Albigensian Crusade, the city quickly surrendered to Simon de Montfort, who gave it to his brother Guy de Montfort.

Lords of Castres

House of Montfort-l'Amaury 

1211-1228 : Guy de Montfort († 1228), Lord of Ferté-Allais et de Bréthecourt, son Simon III de Montfort, Lord of Montfort and d'Amicie de Beaumont.
First marriage in 1204 to Helvis d'Ibelin († avant 1216)
Second marriage in 1224 to Briende de Beynes

1228-1240 : Philip I of Montfort († 1270), Lord of Castres, and later Lord of Tyre and Toron, son of Guy de Montfort and d'Helvis d'Ibelin.
Married to Éléonore de Courtenay († avant 1230), daughter of Peter II of Courtenay and Yolanda of Flanders.
Second marriage in 1240 to Marie d'Antioche, Lady of Toron, daughter of Raymond-Roupen d'Antioche and Helvis de Lusignan

1240-1270 : Philip II of Montfort († 1270), Lord of Castres, son of Philip of Montfort and  d'Éléonore de Courtenay.
Married to Jeanne de Lévis-Mirepoix († June 30, 1284), daughter of Guy I de Lévis, Lord of Mirepoix and Guibourge of Montfort.

1370-1300 : John of Montfort († 1300), Lord of Castres, Count of Squillace, son of Philip II of Montfort and Jeanne de Levis-Mirepoix.
Married Isabella Maletta
Married Giovanna di Fasanella
Married in 1273 to Marguerite de Beaumont († 1307)

1300-1338 : Éléonore de Montfort († après 1338), Lady of Castres, sister of John of Montfort.
Married to John V († 1315), Count of Vendôme

House of Vendôme-Montoire 

1300-1315 : John V († 1315), Count de Vendôme, Lord of Castres.
Married Éléonore de Montfort, Lady of Castres

1338-1354 : Bouchard VI de Vendôme († 1354), Count of Vendôme and Lord of Castres, son of John V of Vendôme.
Married Alice of Brittany († 1377), daughter of Arthur II, Duke of Brittany and Yolande de Dreux

1354-1356 : Jean VI de Vendôme († 1364), Count of Vendôme and Lord of Castres, son of Bouchard VI.
Married Jeanne de Ponthieu († 1376), daughter of John de Ponthieu, Count d'Aumale, and Catherine d'Artois.

In 1356, King John II of France raises Castres to a county.

Counts of Castres

Maison de Vendôme-Montoire 
1354-1364 : John VI of Vendôme († 1364), Count of Vendôme and Castres
Married Jeanne de Ponthieu († 1376), daughter of John of Ponthieu, Count d'Aumale, and Catherine d'Artois.

1364-1371 : Bouchard VII of Vendôme († 1371), Count of Vendôme and Castres, son of John VI.
Married in 1368 Isabelle of Bourbon, daughter of James I, Count of La Marche and Jeanne de Châtillon

1371-1372 : Jeanne of Vendôme († 1372), Countess of Vendôme and Castres, daughter of Bourchard VII.

1372-1403 : Catherine de Vendôme († 1411), Countess of Vendôme and Castres, aunt of Jeanne, daughter of Jean VI, Count of Vendôme.
Married in 1364 to John of Bourbon-La Marche († 1393), Count of La Marche.

House of Bourbon-La Marche 

1362-1393 : John I of Bourbon, Count of La Marche, Vendôme and Castres.
Married Catherine of Vendôme († 1411), Countess of Vendôme and Castres.

1393-1435 : James II (1370 † 1438), Count of La Marche and Castres, son of John I.
Married in 1406 to Béatrice d'Évreux (1392 † 1414) 
Married in 1415 to Joan II (1375 † 1435), Queen of Naples.

1435-1462 : Éléonore of Bourbon (1412 † ap.1464), Countess of La Marche, Castres  and Duchess of Nemours, daughter of James II. 
Married in 1429 to Bernard d'Armagnac († 1462), Count of Pardiac.

House d'Armagnac

1438-1462 : Bernard de Pardiac|Bernard d'Armagnac († 1462), Count of Pardiac, of La Marche, Castres and Duke of Nemours.
Married in 1429 to Éléonore de Bourbon, daughter of James II and Béatrice d'Évreux.

1462-1476 : Jacques d'Armagnac (1433 † 1477), Count of Pardiac, La Marche and Duke of Nemours.
Married in 1462 to Louise d'Anjou (1445 † 1477).

 In 1476, Jacques d'Armagnac is tried for treason and his property confiscated by Louis XI. He bestows the county of Castres to one of his officers, Boffille de Juge.

House de Juge 
1476-1494 : Boffille de Juge († 1502)
Married in 1480 to Marie d'Albret, daughter of John I d'Albret, sire d'Albret, and Catherine de Rohan.
In 1494, in litigation with the heirs of Jacques d'Armagnac, Boffile yields Castres to his brother-in-law, Alain d'Albret.

House d'Albret 

1494-1519 : Alain, sire d'Albret (1440 † 1522), son of John I d'Albret, sire d'Albret, and Catherine de Rohan.
Married to Frances, Countess of Périgord

From 1502 to 1519, possession of Castres is challenged by the daughter of Boffille de Juge. Finally, in 1519, irritated by the argument, Francis I of France reunites the county of Castres to the royal domain.

Notes

References
 Crowe, Eyre Evans, The History of France, Longman, Brown, Green, Longmans, and Roberts, 1858.
 Cuttler, S.H., The Law of Treason and Treason Trials in Later Medieval France, Cambridge University Press, 2003.
 Dictionnaire de la noblesse, 2nd Ed, Editor: François Alexandre Aubert de la Chenaye Desbois, 1772.